Burl Plunkett (May 26, 1933 – June 6, 2008) is a former basketball coach. Prior to being a head coach, Plunkett played two seasons at Centenary College, averaging 17.9 and 14.4 points per game, respectively.  He served as the head coach for numerous high schools, including his hometown school of Valliant (1962-1965), Tuloso-Midway (Corpus Christi, Texas) High School (1966–71), Byng High School (1971-79) and Idabel High School (1980–90), winning three state titles with Byng. Plunkett served as the seventh head coach of the University of Oklahoma women's basketball program from 1993 to 1996. He had served as assistant coach for three years prior to being hired to replace Gary Hudson. In his first year, he led them to an 18–12 record, good enough for an invitation to the National Women's Invitational Tournament that year as one of the eight teams. The Sooners won the tournament by beating Arkansas State 69–65. The following year, he led them to a 21–8 record and an invite to the 1994 NCAA Division I women's basketball tournament, where they made it to the Second Round before losing to Louisiana Tech 48–36. After a dismal 12–15 season the following year, he retired from the Sooners.

References

1933 births
2008 deaths
American women's basketball coaches
Basketball coaches from Oklahoma
Oklahoma Sooners women's basketball coaches